Ralph Francis Alnwick Grey, Baron Grey of Naunton,  (15 April 1910 – 17 October 1999) was a New Zealand peer who served as the last Governor of Northern Ireland.  He was created a Life Peer as Baron Grey of Naunton, of Naunton in the County of Gloucestershire, on 17 September 1968.

Career 
Ralph Grey was born in Wellington, New Zealand, on 15 April 1910 the only son of Francis Arthur Grey and Mary Wilks Spencer. He attended both Scots College and Wellington College before going up to University College, Auckland where he graduating as LLB.  He then pursued postgraduate studies at Pembroke College, Cambridge and thereafter was called to the Bar.  
He began his legal career as a clerk before practising as a barrister. He was appointed a Solicitor of the Supreme Court of New Zealand in 1932.  He joined the Colonial Administrative Service in 1936, as a probationer.  The following year he was an administrative service cadet at Lagos in Nigeria.  In 1944 he married Esme Mae, daughter of Albert Victor Kerry Burcher, of Remuera, Auckland (widow of Pilot Officer Kenneth Kirkaldie, REFVR).

After World War II, he was promoted Assistant Financial Secretary in 1949.  Two years later, he was an Administrative Officer First Class, quickly moving up to Deputy Secretary. He was appointed an Officer of the Most Excellent Order of the British Empire (OBE) in 1951.  He was Secretary to the Governor-General and General Council of Ministers in 1954, and Chief Secretary of the Federation the following year.  Two years later he was raised up as Deputy Governor-General until just before independence in 1959.  Grey was appointed a Companion of the Most Distinguished Order of Saint Michael and Saint George (CMG) in 1955 and a Knight Commander (KCMG) in 1959. He was first appointed a Knight Commander of the Royal Victorian Order (KCVO) in 1956.   

Grey was transferred to British Guiana as Governor and Commander-in-Chief for five years.  As befitted a Governor he was appointed Knight Grand Cross of the Order of Saint Michael and Saint George (GCMG) in 1964. when he was moved to the Bahamas in the identical post for two years.  Then he transferred to the Turks and Caicos Islands until 1968.  That year Grey became Governor of Northern Ireland during the period of civil rights marches and increasing levels of street violence.  The IRA announced a 'bombing campaign' against British rule which reached new intensity in 1971–72.  In the depths of an economic recession, local government was suspended; Northern Ireland was subjected to Direct Rule from Westminster, and Lord Grey of Naunton was recalled.  During the same period he was President of the Scout Council of Northern Ireland. From 1970 Grey was appointed Chairman of the Chartered Institute of Secretaries of Northern Ireland, supporting industry as an Honorary Member of the Chambers of Commerce and Honorary President of the Lisburn Chamber of Commerce.  From 1970 he was also an Honorary Bencher of the Inns of Court for Northern Ireland.

Lord Grey of Naunton was the last Governor of Northern Ireland until 1973, having been appointed on 11 November 1968. He took office on 3 December 1968. When the post was abolished in 1973, he was promoted Knight Grand Cross of the Royal Victorian Order (GCVO). At the same time he was Knight Commander of Ards, then Bailiff of Egle from 1975, until appointment as Lord Prior of the Most Venerable Order of the Hospital of Saint John of Jerusalem (1988–91).

The family lived in Gloucestershire among the rolling Cotswold hills at Overbrook in the village of Naunton, which provided the territorial designation of his peerage title.  He was a Council member of Cheltenham Ladies College, where his daughter, Amanda, was educated.  As well as regional commitments to Lloyds Bank he served on its board in Bristol during 1970s.  Lord Grey served as Chairman of the Central Council of the Royal Overseas League (1976–81).  He was Chancellor of the New University of Ulster from 1980, and then from 1984 to 1993, he was Chancellor of the University of Ulster.  He received an honorary doctorate from the National University of Ireland (the NUI) in 1985.  Meanwhile, the University of Ulster awarded Honorary Doctorate of Literature and Doctorate of Science in the space of five years.

In retirement Grey was invited to be admitted to Gray's Inn.  He was Grand President of the Royal Overseas League in 1993, Chairman of its General Council, but had been president since 1981. Grey died on 17 October 1999 in Naunton.

Family 
Lady Grey of Naunton died on 22 March 1996; he and his wife had three children:

 The Hon. Jolyon Kenneth Alnwick Grey (b.1946-)
 The Hon. Jeremy Francis Alnwick Grey (b.1949-)
 The Hon. Amanda Mary Alnwick Grey (b.1951-)

Arms

References

Bibliography
 
 

 
 

1910 births
1999 deaths
People from Wellington City
Bailiffs Grand Cross of the Order of St John
British diplomats
British governors of the Bahamas
Colonial Administrative Service officers
Diplomatic peers
Governors of British Guiana
New Zealand Knights Grand Cross of the Order of St Michael and St George
New Zealand Knights Grand Cross of the Royal Victorian Order
New Zealand recipients of a British peerage
Life peers created by Elizabeth II
20th-century New Zealand lawyers
New Zealand Officers of the Order of the British Empire
Grey of Naunton
People educated at Scots College, Wellington
People educated at Wellington College (New Zealand)
20th-century Bahamian people
20th-century British politicians
Chancellors of Ulster University
20th-century Bahamian politicians